Interstate 290 (I-290) is an auxiliary Interstate Highway that runs westward from the Chicago Loop. The portion of I-290 from I-294 to its east end is officially called the Dwight D. Eisenhower Expressway. In short form, it is known as "the Ike" or the Eisenhower. Before being designated the Eisenhower Expressway, the highway was called the Congress Expressway because of the surface street that was located approximately in its path and onto which I-290 runs at its eastern terminus in the Loop.

I-290 connects I-90 (Jane Addams Memorial Tollway) in Rolling Meadows with I-90/I-94 (John F. Kennedy Expressway/Dan Ryan Expressway) near the Loop. North of I-355, the freeway is sometimes known locally as Illinois Route 53 (IL 53), or simply Route 53, since IL 53 existed before I-290. However, it now merges with I-290 at Biesterfield Road.

Route description

Jane Addams Memorial Tollway to Veterans Memorial Tollway 

It is the portion of I-290 more locally known as "Route 53". Here, I-290 runs largely above-grade through Schaumburg and Elk Grove Village and at- or below-grade through Itasca and Addison.

The northern  of this highway were reconstructed in 2003–2004. A left shoulder and an auxiliary lane between ramps were added, as well as improved lighting. The highway is four lanes wide (not counting the auxiliary lane) north of IL 390 (milemarker 5) and five lanes wide with a wide left shoulder south to the exit to I-355.

Between milemarkers 0 and 4, IL 53 overlaps this section of the Eisenhower Expressway.

Eisenhower Extension 

It took its name when the Eisenhower was extended northwest from Hillside. The highway runs largely at-grade or above-grade for this length. US Route 20 (US 20) overlaps I-290 around Elmhurst from milemarkers 12 to 13 and runs parallel to the rest of this section between milemarkers 7 and 18.

This section of I-290 varies in width from two lanes at the ramp east from the I-290/I-355 split to three lanes between I-355 and US 20, to three lanes plus two exit lanes at US 20/IL 64 (Lake Street/North Avenue; exit 13B). After exit 13B, the highway reverts to three through traffic lanes. This is because the ramp is not isolated from the mainline, only one lane in width, is a low-speed ramp (marked as a  ramp), and is relatively short while carrying a high volume of truck traffic south to Indiana from North Avenue. Additionally, the sudden appearance of the exit tends to cause accidents when cars in the center lane try to aggressively turn into the right lane, particularly at the mouth of the I-294 exit. Finally, there is a dangerous high-volume weaving situation at the end of the ramp to I-294 with southbound I-294 traffic exiting to westbound I-88. , there are no plans to overcome any of these problems with new construction.

The western  of this section are blacktop, while east of IL 83 (exit 10) the original concrete is still in place.

Tri-State Tollway to Austin Boulevard 

This section is sometimes referred to as the "Avenues". , it is the third-most-congested stretch of highway in the Chicago metropolitan area, behind the Jane Byrne Interchange area and the intersection of the Dan Ryan Expressway and Chicago Skyway. It is known for having a high volume of traffic on ramps through the Avenues, and high volumes of traffic on left-side ramps in Forest Park and Oak Park. I-290 runs above-grade west of Mannheim Road and at- or below-grade east of Mannheim Road.

Eastbound at Mannheim Road (exit 17), the highway splits into two express and one local lane; they are joined by two onramps from I-88 and form express lanes three lanes wide and local lanes to Mannheim Road two lanes wide. After Mannheim Road, the highway immediately narrows to three lanes in width, causing mile-long backups. It remains three lanes to Austin Boulevard. Westbound, I-290 merely is three lanes wide to Mannheim Road and then four lanes wide to the I-88/I-290 split. Exits at Harlem Avenue (exit 21B) and Austin Boulevard (exit 23) are inverted single-point urban interchanges (inverted SPUIs), with left offramps and onramps. These cause backups as trucks switch lanes to exit and a large volume of traffic enters on the left side of the highway.

In 2001–2002, this section between milemarkers 15 and 18 was reconstructed in the first phase of an attempt to untangle the "Hillside Strangler", adding the local lanes and extra onramp to I-290. The second phase, reconstruction of the highway between milemarkers 18 and 23 (Mannheim Road to Austin Boulevard), is still in the preliminary engineering phase of construction .

Austin Boulevard to Chicago Loop 

It runs below grade for its entire length.

This highway is four lanes wide in both directions for its entire length, and most onramps and offramps are located just two blocks apart. Therefore, an exit in one direction may be marked one street (e.g., Laramie Avenue), while the same exit in the other direction may be marked another (e.g., Cicero Avenue), even though the streets are only a block apart. This configuration results in most exits on this portion of the road being marked as A/B exits.

Eastbound congestion is lighter here than through the "Avenues", generally limited to congestion on the tight onramps to the Kennedy and Dan Ryan expressways (Jane Byrne Interchange) at the eastern terminus or blind onramps at Kostner and Homan avenues. Westbound, congestion is heavy starting at Laramie due to the left-hand exit at Austin (which combines a "perfect storm" of a four-down-to-three lane reduction, an unfamiliar left-hand exit, and entrance and in-merging traffic of the central onramp).  Most afternoons, this bottleneck can skyrocket the "Post Office to Wolf (Road)" commute time to over an hour (up from 16 minutes with no traffic).

The Eisenhower Expressway runs along blacktop pavement for the length of the section, except between Kostner Avenue and Independence Boulevard, where it runs on concrete pavement.

The eastern terminus of I-290 is the Jane Byrne Interchange with I-90/I-94. After this junction, the route becomes elevated and continues as a highway until LaSalle Street, at which point it passes under LaSalle Street Station and comes out the other side as a city street (Ida B. Wells Drive). The Ida B. Wells Drive route continues east until the street is stopped by Buckingham Fountain.

The Blue Line operates in the median of the Eisenhower from Halsted Street to Cicero Avenue. After Cicero, the line leaves the median and runs on the south side of the Eisenhower for the remainder of its route to Des Plaines Avenue, Forest Park.

History 

Rapid transit had existed in the vicinity of the future expressway's right of way since 1895, when the Metropolitan West Side Elevated Railroad opened its main line east of Marshfield Avenue on May 6 and its Garfield Park branch west to 48th Avenue (modern-day Cicero Avenue) on June 19. The Metropolitan's lines, alongside the rest of Chicago's rapid transit network, were assumed by the Chicago Rapid Transit Company (CRT) in 1924.

An expressway along the alignment of the Eisenhower Expressway was foreshadowed by Daniel Burnham's plan of 1909, which described a west side boulevard. Use of the automobile boomed in the 1920s, leading to extreme traffic on Chicago's west side and the first serious plans of an expressway by Congress Street in the early 1930s. The passageway under the Old Post Office was designed to preserve the right of way for this future road.

The expressway is named for the former President Dwight D. Eisenhower, who signed the Federal-Aid Highway Act of 1956 and came up with the original concept for the Interstate Highway System; it originally was called the Congress Expressway because it partially follows the route of Congress Parkway (portions now called Ida B. Wells Drive) in Chicago. The first segment,  in length, opened from Mannheim Road to 1st Avenue in December 1955. On December 15, an additional  was opened, from Ashland Avenue (1600 West) to Laramie Avenue (5200 West).

During the 1960s and 1970s, the Eisenhower Expressway was extended to Lake Street and North Avenue in Elmhurst. In 1963, the first working example of ramp metering took place on the Eisenhower Expressway, based on successful metering through New York City tunnels and data from ramp closures in Detroit, Michigan. The first implementation utilized a police officer at the top of an entrance ramp, stopping and releasing vehicles onto the highway at a predetermined rate. Another section opened in 1972, to a north–south expressway in Addison, Illinois. At the time, this expressway was a short spur from the Eisenhower Expressway, and it was referred to as IL 53, which continued north to Schaumburg. Construction on IL 53 had finished in 1970.

Until 1977, the Eisenhower Expressway was marked as a part of I-90. In 1978, the I-90 designation was moved onto the John F. Kennedy Expressway and the Northwest Tollway, replacing IL 194. The Eisenhower Expressway was then renumbered as I-290 and signage was updated in 1979.

Because the segment from I-294 to IL 53 was built last, that portion of the highway is referred to as the Eisenhower Extension.

In 2003–2004, the first  of I-290 out of Schaumburg were rebuilt, replacing pavement that had well-exceeded its estimated 20-year lifetime. (The original pavement was built in stages from 1963 through 1970 as part of IL 53.) A fifth auxiliary lane was added between the entrance and exit ramps of exits 1, 4, and 5. The most important safety upgrade was the demolition of the raised grassy median between the westbound and eastbound lanes, and its replacement with a permanent concrete median and wide shoulders.

 Hillside Strangler: Named after the Chicago suburb of Hillside, it refers to a major merge with I-88, and almost always is used when referring to inbound (eastbound) traffic. It is at this point that I-88 terminates eastbound. It was called the Strangler because, before its reconstruction in the early 2000s, seven throughlanes were forced to merge to three, creating large backups. Reconstruction widened part of this area to nine lanes (five inbound; three through; two local; and four through outbound). This allowed direct exits to Mannheim Road (US 12/US 20/US 45) from I-88, the ramp also serving for an I-88 truck access to eastbound I-290; created an inbound collector–distributor ramp for Mannheim Road; and added a timed gate that closed a ramp from Roosevelt Road (IL 38) to inbound I-290 during the afternoon rush hours. These improvements helped congestion at the site, but they also pushed preexisting congestion further east to the six-lane portion of the highway. The Hillside Strangler is located at about milemarker 18.
Named because all of the crossroads between these two exits are named numerically, in ascending order traveling outbound (westbound). 1st Avenue (IL 171) is exit 20. There are exits to 9th, 17th, and 25th avenues to the west. This stretch is notorious for being very congested.
 Eisenhower Extension or 290 Extension: The  of road between current-day milemarker 7 (I-355 south to US 20/Lake Street) and North Avenue (IL 64), milemarker 15. This section was built in the late 1970s.
 Jane Byrne Interchange: The eastern terminus of I-290 where it meets I-90/I-94, which overlap through Chicago. North of this interchange I-90/I- 94 is called the Kennedy Expressway, while south of it I-90/I-94 is called the Dan Ryan Expressway. The interchange itself consists of eight heavily used, very tight ramps that wind around each other, giving the interchange a distinct circle shape when looked at from above. This design, adequate when first built in the 1950s, forces drivers to slow down to speeds of about  due to its tightly wound curves. Not only does this led to the worst congestion in the Chicago area, a 2010 study of freight congestion (truck speed and travel time) by the Federal Highway Administration ranked this section of the I-290 as having the worst congestion in the US; the average truck speed just . The interchange is currently being reworked with an estimated completion date.

Old Post Office 

Just east of the I-290–I-90/I-94 junction in downtown Chicago, the Old Chicago Main Post Office is a building that stretches over Ida B. Wells Drive. If one drives eastbound on I-290 and continues past I-90/I-94, the highway ends and becomes Ida B. Wells Drive. The Old Post Office was a landmark that was sometimes used in referring to the end of I-290 in downtown Chicago. For example, a traffic reporter might say "forty minutes from Mannheim to the Post Office".

This large building was used by the US Postal Service (USPS) until 1996. The building, built several decades before the expressway that passes through it, was originally designed to accommodate a roadway—requiring only minimal work to remove walls in the base for the freeway to pass through. In spite of its unused state, the building is still known to visitors and commuters alike as the unofficial gateway into the Loop area. In late August 2009, the USPS announced an auction was to be held to sell the facility to the highest bidder. The winning bid ($40 million [equivalent to $ in ]) was from an English real-estate developer, Bill Davies.

Exit list

References

Works cited

External links 

 Kurumi's 3di page — I-290
 Illinois Highway Ends: Interstate 290
 Historic, Current & Average Travel Times For The Eisenhower Expressway
 Official IDOT website

2 (Illinois)
Expressways in the Chicago area
90-2
90-2 Illinois
Transportation in Cook County, Illinois
Transportation in DuPage County, Illinois